Onion Creek is a small tributary stream of the Colorado River in Texas. While areas surrounding the creek's origin in Blanco County are primarily rural, areas closer to its mouth in Travis County have more urban and industrial development. Passing near Dripping Springs, Driftwood, and Onion Creek, Onion Creek is the source of the waterfalls in McKinney Falls State Park.

2013 Flood

On October 31, 2013 Onion Creek experienced historic levels of flooding, cresting at 40.15 ft, a level not seen since 1921. Over the course of 4h 9-10in of rain fell in the Onion Creek watershed. The flood had a flow rate of over 120,000 cubic feet per second, more than twice that of Niagara Falls. In the end, five people died and more than 500 homes were damaged by flood waters.

As a result of the flood the City of Austin purchased hundreds of homes in the floodplain. These properties have formed the northern section of the Onion Creek Metropolitan Park since 2019.

See also
List of rivers of Texas

References

USGS Geographic Names Information Service
USGS Hydrologic Unit Map - State of Texas (1974)

External links

Rivers of Texas
Tributaries of the Colorado River (Texas)
Rivers of Blanco County, Texas
Rivers of Travis County, Texas
Geography of Austin, Texas